Ștefan Nicolae Bărboianu (born 24 January 1988) is a Romanian footballer who plays as a right back or as a defensive midfielder for Liga III club CSM Reșița.

Club career

Universitatea Craiova
Bărboianu started his career at Universitatea Craiova. In February 2011 he was declared free agent, but in the meantime he signed a new contract with Craiova, from 1 July 2011. So Bărboianu played in the Spring of 2011 for Dinamo București, and returned to Craiova in July. Following the disaffiliation of Universitatea, Bărboianu was again declared free agent and signed on 3 August 2011 a contract for five years with Astra Giurgiu.

Dinamo București
Bărboianu had two terms at Dinamo. The first one was a short one, for only four months, from February until May 2011. He was released after an own-goal in the 2011 Cupa României Final, that sent the trophy to Dinamo's biggest rivals, Steaua București. In December 2013, Bărboianu returned to Dinamo and played until May 2015, when in a match again versus Steaua, he conceded a penalty which led to the first goal of the game, won by Steaua 3–1. Two days after the game, his contract with Dinamo was ended by mutual agreement.

Honours
Universitatea Craiova
Divizia B: 2005–06

Concordia Chiajna
Cupa Ligii runner-up: 2015–16

CSM Reșița
Liga III: 2021–22

References

External links
 
 

1988 births
Sportspeople from Craiova
Living people
Romanian footballers
Association football defenders
FC U Craiova 1948 players
FC Dinamo București players
FC Astra Giurgiu players
CS Concordia Chiajna players
FC Petrolul Ploiești players
AFC Turris-Oltul Turnu Măgurele players
CSM Reșița players
Liga I players
Liga II players
Liga III players
Romania under-21 international footballers